Maarten Boddaert (born 12 September 1989) is a Dutch footballer who plays for the Hoofdklasse club Achilles Veen.

Club career
Boddaert played 5 seasons as a midfielder for FC Den Bosch in the Dutch Eerste Divisie. He formerly played for RBC Roosendaal. Den Bosch released their former skipper in summer 2016 and he then had a trial at Telstar and a month-long trial with VVV-Venlo but a move did not materialize.

Boddaert signed for Adelaide Comets in the PS4 NPL SA in Australia's second tier of football in January, 2017 for the 2017 FFSA season.

In August 2017, Boddaert returned to the Netherlands where he signed with Achilles Veen.

References

External links
 Voetbal International profile 

1989 births
Living people
Sportspeople from Roosendaal
Association football midfielders
Dutch footballers
RBC Roosendaal players
FC Den Bosch players
Adelaide Comets FC players
Eerste Divisie players
Vierde Divisie players
National Premier Leagues players
Achilles Veen players
Footballers from North Brabant
Dutch expatriate sportspeople in Australia
Expatriate soccer players in Australia
Dutch expatriate footballers